Dennington is an English toponymic surname. Notable people with this name include:

 Arthur Dennington, British conductor and composer
 Charles Dennington, English football goalkeeper
 Jack Dennington, Australian rules footballer
 Matthew Dennington, South African cricketer

See also 
 

English toponymic surnames